The 32 teams were drawn into nine groups of three or four teams each; however, after the withdrawal of Syria, one group had just two teams. The teams played against each other on a home-and-away basis. The group winners would qualify.

Groups

Group 1

Group 2

Group 3

Group 4

Group 5

Group 6

Group 7

Group 8

Group 9

Goalscorers

7 goals
 Eusébio

6 goals
 Mimis Papaioannou

5 goals
 Paul Van Himst
 Georgi Asparuhov
 Sandro Mazzola
 Johnny Crossan
 Włodzimierz Lubański
 Anatoliy Banishevskiy

4 goals
 Nikola Kotkov
 František Knebort
 Roy Vernon
 Milan Galić

3 goals

 Johnny Thio
 Karol Jokl
 Juhani Peltonen
 Nestor Combin
 Philippe Gondet
 Giorgos Sideris
 Paolo Barison
 Louis Pilot
 Jerzy Sadek
 Valentin Kozmich Ivanov
 Slava Metreveli
 Chus Pereda
 Köbi Kuhn
 Ivor Allchurch
 Rudolf Brunnenmeier

2 goals

 Ivan Mráz
 Ole Fritsen
 Ole Madsen
 Peter Ducke
 Jürgen Nöldner
 János Farkas
 Máté Fenyvesi
 Giacinto Facchetti
 Bruno Mora
 Gianni Rivera
 Hennie van Nee
 George Best
 Harald Berg
 Erik Johansen
 Ernest Pol
 Nicolae Georgescu
 Viorel Mateianu
 John Greig
 Denis Law
 Vladimir Barkaya
 Lars Granström
 Bo Larsson
 Agne Simonsson
 Torbjörn Jonsson
 René-Pierre Quentin
 Fevzi Zemzem
 Werner Krämer
 Wolfgang Overath
 Klaus-Dieter Sieloff
 Dragan Džajić

1 goal

 Mexhit Haxhiu
 Robert Jashari
 Erich Hof
 Armand Jurion
 Wilfried Puis
 Jacques Stockman
 Stoyan Kitov
 Ivan Petkov Kolev
 Alexander Horváth
 Dušan Kabát
 Andrej Kvašňák
 Mogens Berg
 Kaj Poulsen
 Tommy Troelsen
 Eberhard Vogel
 Martti Hyvärinen
 Semi Nuoranen
 Marcel Artelesa
 André Guy
 Angel Rambert
 Andreas Papaemmanouil
 Ferenc Bene
 Kálmán Mészöly
 Dezső Novák
 Gyula Rákosi
 Andy McEvoy
 Rahamim Talbi
 Giacomo Bulgarelli
 Ezio Pascutti
 Ernest Brenner
 Edy Dublin
 Ady Schmit
 Frans Geurtsen
 Theo Laseroms
 Bennie Muller
 Daan Schrijvers
 Willie Irvine
 Terry Neill
 Per Kristoffersen
 Olav Nilsen
 Arne Pedersen
 Finn Seemann
 Kai Sjøberg
 Ole Stavrum
 Roman Lentner
 Mário Coluna
 Jaime Graça
 Sorin Avram
 Alexandru Badea
 Dan Coe
 Carol Creiniceanu
 Ion Pârcălab
 Stevie Chalmers
 Dave Gibson
 Billy McNeill
 Davie Wilson
 Boris Kazakov
 Galimzyan Khusainov
 Mikheil Meskhi
 Yozhef Sabo
 Valery Voronin
 Carlos Lapetra
 José Ufarte
 Kurt Hamrin
 Ove Kindvall
 Anton Allemann
 Robert Hosp
 Ayhan Elmastaşoğlu
 Nedim Doğan
 Ron Davies
 Wyn Davies
 Mike England
 Ronnie Rees
 Alfred Heiß
 Uwe Seeler
 Heinz Strehl
 Horst Szymaniak
 Dražan Jerković
 Vladica Kovačević
 Džemaludin Mušović
 Velibor Vasović

1 own goal
 Ivan Vutsov (playing against Belgium)
 Kostas Panayiotou (playing against West Germany)
 Stig Holmqvist (playing against Italy)
 José Ángel Iribar (playing against Ireland)
 Graham Williams (playing against the Soviet Union)

References

 
UEFA
1966